Let's Build Something to Break is the debut full-length album by American rock band, After Midnight Project. It was released on August 11, 2009 through Universal Motown.  The album was produced by renowned producer and Goldfinger frontman, John Feldmann.

"Take Me Home" is the first single off the album.  That track, along with "The Real Thing" and "The Becoming", were previously released on their EP The Becoming. "Take Me Home" was also featured during the end credits of the 2006 video game Prey.

Track listing
All tracks written by Jason Evigan except where noted
"Backlit Medley" – 3:43
"The Becoming" – 3:32
"Scream For You" – 3:07
"Take Me Home" – 3:45
"More to Live For" – 3:49
"Gone Too Long" – 4:15
"Hollywood" – 3:02
"The Real Thing" – 3:50 (Jason Evigan and John Feldmann)
"Come On Come On" – 2:57 (Jason Evigan and Spencer Bastian)
"Fighting My Way Back" – 4:09 (Jason Evigan and Zac Maloy)
"The Criminal" – 5:11 (Jason Evigan and John Feldmann)

Personnel
 Jason Evigan - vocals, piano, guitar, bouzouki 
 Spencer Bastian - guitar 
 Danny Morris - drums 
 TJ Armstrong - bass, vocals 
 Christian Meadows - guitar

Additional musicians
 John Feldmann – percussion 
 Matt Appleton – guitar ("Gone Too Long"); trumpet, trombone, baritone sax, ukulele ("The Criminal") 
 Kyle Moorman – guitar ("The Real Thing", "Backlit Medley") 
 Jon Nicholson – big drums ("The Real Thing", "Take Me Home") 
 Justin Rubinstein – accordion ("The Criminal") 
 John Feldmann, Matt Appleton, Spencer Bastian, Andrew Clore, Amy Feldmann, Victoria Janzen, Christian Paul Meadows, Danny Morris, Jess Neilson - additional vocals

References

2009 albums
After Midnight Project albums
Albums produced by John Feldmann